Pineda may refer to: 
 Pineda (surname)
 Pineda (plant), a genus of flowering plants in the family Salicaceae
 Pineda, Guerrero, Mexico
 Pineda, Florida, U.S.

See also
 Arnel Pineda (album), an album by Arnel Pineda
 Estadio Winston Pineda (El Condor), a soccer stadium in Escuintla, Guatemala
 Pineda de Gigüela, a municipality in the province of Cuenca, Spain
 Pineda de la Sierra, a municipality in the province of Burgos, Spain
 Pineda de Mar, a municipality in Catalonia, Spain
 Pineda Trasmonte, a municipality in the province of Burgos, Spain
 Pinedas, a municipality in the province of Salamanca, Spain